Richard Bognar (January 16, 1970 – September 20, 2019) was a Canadian professional wrestler, actor, and motivational speaker, best known as the "fake" Razor Ramon who debuted in the World Wrestling Federation alongside the "fake" Diesel in a storyline following the departures of Scott Hall (Razor Ramon) and Kevin Nash (Diesel) from the WWF to WCW. He also wrestled as Big Titan in Frontier Martial-Arts Wrestling.

Professional wrestling career

Canada (1988–1991)
Titan debuted in 1988 in Canadian indies, including the WFWA in Winnipeg, CIWF and the CNWA; both in Calgary. He also wrestled for Stampede Wrestling.

Frontier Martial-Arts Wrestling (1991–1994)
In 1991 as Big Titan through Ricky Fuji's connections in Canada and he joined the Japanese Frontier Martial-Arts Wrestling. He made his debut on November 20, 1991 while entering into the FMW World Strongest Tag Team Tournament with The Gladiator. He won the World Martial Arts Heavyweight Championship on January 15, 1992, defeating Atsushi Onita. Titan's reign lasted just fifteen days before he lost to Tarzan Goto in Osaka on January 30. He was also part of the original Team Canada stable with Ricky Fuji, Dr. Luther, and The Gladiator. He formed a tag team with The Gladiator, and on January 18, 1994, they defeated Atsushi Onita and Katsutoshi Niyama in a tournament final to become the first ever Brass Knuckles Tag Team Champions. Their reign lasted until April 21, 1994, when they lost to Mr. Pogo and Hisakatsu Oya. His last match for the company would be on December 9, 1994 at Korakuen Hall in a loss to The Gladiator.

Catch Wrestling Association (1994-1995)
After Japan, Bognar made his debut for Catch Wrestling Association in Germany on December 17, 1994 as he lost to Rambo. He would feud with Rambo, August Smisl, Cannonball Grizzly and Tony St. Clair. He left the company in December 1995.

Wrestle and Romance / Wrestle Association R (1995–1996)
He would join Genichiro Tenryu's WAR in 1995. In WAR, he wrestled under the name Ti Do, and he was an ally of Fuyuki-Gun, which consisted of Hiromichi "Kodo" Fuyuki, Gedo, and Jado; Lion Do would also join the group. He left in August 1996.

Extreme Championship Wrestling (1996)
Bognar briefly appeared in ECW, wrestling as Big Titan. He appeared at Big Ass Extreme Bash in March 1996, defeating Judge Dredd. The next day he lost to Sabu.

World Wrestling Federation (1996–1997)
In September 1996, play-by-play announcer Jim Ross introduced Bognar as "Razor Ramon" and Glenn Jacobs as "Diesel" as part of a storyline mocking the departure of former employees Scott Hall and Kevin Nash, who had left for WCW. The storyline was also an attempt to turn Ross into a heel. However, the Jim Ross heel turn proved unpopular and was dropped almost immediately. The fake Razor Ramon and Diesel storyline also proved unpopular with the fans. On the October 20 episode of Superstars, Fake Razor defeated Bob Holly. On October 21, he scored an upset victory over Marc Mero on Monday Night Raw. On the November 3 episode of WWF Superstars of Wrestling, Bognar and Fake Diesel defeated Barry Horowitz and Aldo Montoya. At Survivor Series (1996), Bognar teamed with Faarooq, Vader, and the second Diesel to compete in a four-on-four Survivor Series tag team elimination match against Flash Funk, Jimmy Snuka, Savio Vega, and Yokozuna that ended in a no contest. Bognar would also suffer losses to the likes of Savio Vega and Bret Hart. Bognar and Fake Diesel also defeated The Godwinns on an episode of Raw in January 1997. On January 11, he wrestled in the main event of the second episode of WWF Shotgun Saturday Night as he lost to Rocky Maivia. Despite receiving a WWF Tag Team Championship match against Owen Hart and The British Bulldog at the In Your House 12: It's Time pay-per-view (which they lost), the gimmick's television lifespan lasted only until the 1997 Royal Rumble. Bognar was the first one eliminated in the Royal Rumble match, when he was eliminated by Ahmed Johnson. Jacobs, meanwhile, was the last wrestler legally eliminated from the Royal Rumble match.

Asistencia Asesoría y Administración (1997) 
In March 1997 both Diesel and Ramon wrestled in Mexico for Asistencia Asesoría y Administración in tag team matches with Fuerza Guerrera and Pentagón against El Canek, Latin Lover and Cibernético. They spent a couple of months there.

United States Wrestling Association (1997)
Immediately after the 1997 Royal Rumble both Jacobs and Bognar were sent to the United States Wrestling Association as part of a talent exchange program. Initially the two continued their partnership, but would later come to blows. Jacobs lost a "loser leaves town" match to Bognar on June 24 in Louisville, KY, but would return a short time later under a mask as Doomsday. Jacobs was further repackaged later that year as The Undertaker's brother Kane and went on to experience considerable success. Bogner himself publicly discarded his Razor Ramon attire on USWA television and stated that he would now go by the name "Rick Titan" that July. After defeating Bulldog Raines in Lebanon, TN on August 30, Bognar left the company, as his one-year contract had expired. The promotion would ultimately become defunct in November of that year.

World Wrestling Council (1997) 
After USWA, he went to Puerto Rico to work for World Wrestling Council as Razor Ramon in October where he feuded with Carlos Colon. He lost to Colon in all of their matches.

New Japan Pro-Wrestling (1998–1999)
Titan returned to Japan, where he joined New Japan Pro-Wrestling and became a member of the villainous nWo Japan stable. He ended up injuring his neck in a match against Shinya Hashimoto on February 15, 1998 at the Nippon Budokan Hall. Although he wrestled a couple of more tours after his neck injury, he never felt the same afterwards and wrestled his last match on April 23, 1999 at the Tokyo Ryogoku Kokugikan when he teamed with Keiji Muto and Hiroyoshi Tenzan defeating Tatsumi Fujinami, Manabu Nakanishi and Osamu Nishimura.

Return to Canada (1997–2000)
He returned to Canada for the first time since 1991. Working for Can-Am Wrestling Federation based in Alberta and Saskatchewan. He feuded with Biff Wellington. In 1999, he returned to Stampede Wrestling after the company folded in 1990 and revamped in early 1999 by Ross and Bruce Hart. He would retire from wrestling in 2000.

Return to wrestling (2012)
Bognar returned to wrestling after being inactive for 12 years on September 29, 2012. He wrestled in Calgary for CNWA Mega Expo which he teamed with Raam Dante to defeat KC Andrews and Kenny Doll. This was his last match.

Acting and motivational speaking career
Titan appeared in the Honey, I Shrunk the Kids: The TV Show episode "Honey, Meet the Barbarians" as the "Meanest Barbarian" on February 6, 1998.

After his wrestling career was over, Bognar found a new career as a motivational speaker (calling it transformational speaker) after reading a book about the Buddha which he found in a night stand. He began studying eastern religions and once said "At the end of it all, I was about 30 years old and I thought, 'Jeez, what am I going to do with my life?' I knew I wasn't going to be able to go back," said Titan. "Eventually I studied with a Buddhist monk for about four years, a Tibetan Buddhist monk. He taught me a lot, on meditation, on how to calm the mind, on how to de-stress."

Death
On September 20, 2019, Bognar died of an "unexpected and sudden" heart attack. He was 49 years old. Other wrestlers such as Chris Jericho and Glenn Jacobs paid tributes to him on Instagram and Twitter.

Filmography

Championships and accomplishments 
Canadian Rocky Mountain Wrestling
CRMW International Championship (2 times)

Frontier Martial-Arts Wrestling
FMW Brass Knuckles Heavyweight Championship (1 time)
FMW Brass Knuckles Tag Team Championship (1 time) – with The Gladiator
FMW Brass Knuckles Tag Team Championship Tournament (1994) – with The Gladiator

Pro Wrestling Illustrated
PWI ranked him #124 of the top 500 singles wrestlers in the PWI 500 in 1995

Wrestling Observer Newsletter
Worst Gimmick (1996) as Fake Razor Ramon
 Most Disgusting Promotional Tactic (1996) Fake Razor Ramon gimmick

See also
 List of premature professional wrestling deaths

References

External links 
 
 

1970 births
2019 deaths
20th-century professional wrestlers
21st-century professional wrestlers
Canadian memoirists
Canadian people of German descent
Canadian male professional wrestlers
Canadian male television actors
Expatriate professional wrestlers in Japan
Fictional impostors
FMW Brass Knuckles Heavyweight Champions
FMW Brass Knuckles Tag Team Champions
Male actors from British Columbia
Male actors from Calgary
People from Surrey, British Columbia
Professional wrestlers from Calgary
New World Order (professional wrestling) members